Crescenta Valley High School is a high school in La Crescenta, California. Around 2500 students attend the school, which serves North Glendale, unincorporated La Crescenta and Montrose, as well as a municipal neighborhood on the western boundary of the City of La Cañada Flintridge.

Crescenta Valley received a National Blue Ribbon School award in 2000 and a California Distinguished School award in 2005. Crescenta Valley received a Bravo Award for excellence in the arts from Los Angeles County in 2005. CVHS was awarded again by the California Department of Education in 2019 with California Distinguished School with Exemplary Programs in Arts Education, and Physical Activity and Nutrition. In 2012, the school made headlines after a 15-year-old student jumped off the roof committing suicide.

Notable alumni
Trevor Bell, MLB pitcher
Billy Booth, child actor, Dennis the Menace, and lawyer
Natalia Cigliuti, television and movie actor
 Bethany Cosentino, guitarist and vocalist of Best Coast
Michele Greco, WNBA champion, played with the Seattle Storm
Brad Holland, NBA player
 Tom Holmoe, 4 x Super Bowl  Winning Safety for the 49ers and current BYU Athletic Director 
Steve Howey, actor
Mike Hull, NFL player
John Huh, pro golfer
Nada Kawar, Olympic athlete for Jordan
Eric Lloyd, child actor and producer 
 Harvey Mason Jr., award-winning music and film producer 
Mike Norseth NFL player 
Bill Slayback, baseball player for Detroit Tigers (1972–1974)
Tinashe, singer
Wil Wheaton, actor, Star Trek: The Next Generation
 Steven Zaillian, Academy Award-winning screenwriter

References

External links
Crescenta Valley High School Web Page

Educational institutions established in 1960
High schools in Los Angeles County, California
Public high schools in California
Education in Glendale, California
Buildings and structures in Glendale, California
1960 establishments in California